is a Japanese manga series written and illustrated by Taizan 5. It has been serialized in Shueisha's shōnen manga magazine Weekly Shōnen Jump since November 2022.

Plot summary
The series centers around the titular Ichinose family—Tsubasa, his sister Shiori, their parents Kakeru and Minako, and their grandparents Kozo and Sachie. All six of them wake up in the hospital following a car accident, and all suffer from shock-based amnesia making them unable to remember their lives before the accident. Tsubasa and his family decide to simply return home in the hopes that they can learn more about their past selves there, only to find that their family situation is more complicated than they expected.

Characters

Publication
Shueisha released the first tankōbon volume on March 3, 2023.

The manga has been published digitally in English by Viz Media and Shueisha's Manga Plus online platform.

Volume list

See also
 Takopi's Original Sin, another manga series by the same author

References

External links
  
 

Drama anime and manga
Fiction about amnesia
Shōnen manga
Shueisha manga
Suspense anime and manga
Viz Media manga